Edwin van Gelder (born 21 January 1978, Nijmegen) is a Dutch graphic designer and art director based in Amsterdam. He graduated from the graphic design department at the Utrecht School of the Arts in 2004. In 2005 Van Gelder founded graphic design studio Mainstudio.

Van Gelder is best known for his typographically driven, book and identity designs for clients within architecture, contemporary art, and fashion. He describes his work as Systemic Design — a term coined by Swiss designer Karl Gerstner. Through this approach, Van Gelder conveys the content and voice of a book or identity through the designs they are bound in.

Van Gelder is a guest lecturer at the Academy of Architecture Amsterdam (Academie van Bouwkunst).

Awards 
Van Gelder's work has been awarded with various design awards, including:
2021: Best Dutch Book Design for the artist books Masahisa Fukase – Kill the Pig  and Jorge Méndez Blake – Lenguaje Desmantelado | Dismantled Language 
2021: AIGA 50 Books 50 Covers for the artist book Masahisa Fukase – Kill the Pig 
2020: shortlist DAM Architectural Book Award for the book design of The Walter Benjamin and Albert S. Project  
2020: Type Directors Club for the visual identity of the festival Strange Sounds From Beyond  
2020: AIGA 50 Books 50 Covers for the book Being The Mountain, Productora 
2020: Best Dutch Book Design for the artist book Remy Jungerman. Where the River Runs  and Wiel Arets - Unconscious City  
2019: AIGA 50 Books 50 Covers for the artist book Remy Jungerman. Where the River Runs  
2019: Best Dutch Book Design for the book design of The Walter Benjamin and Albert S. Project 
2018: AIGA 50 Books 50 Covers for the artist book Álvaro Siza Viera: A Pool in the Sea 
2017: Best Dutch Book Design for the monograph Tirzo Martha: I wonder if they’ll laugh when I’m dead 
2017: ADCN (Club for Creativity) for the visual identity of De School 
2016: Best Dutch Book Design for MCHAP 1 - The Americas 
2012: Graphis Inc. 100 Best Annual Reports for the annual report of Mondriaan Foundation
2012: Communication Arts Typography Annual for STILLS, Wiel Arets, A Timeline of Ideas, Articles & Interviews 1982–2010 
2012: Best Dutch Book Design for the artist book Thomas Raat - An Inquiry into Meaning and Truth and More… 
2011: Best Dutch Annual Reports for the annual report of Mondriaan Foundation
2011: I.D. Magazine Annual Design Review 
2011: Best Dutch Book Design for STILLS, Wiel Arets, A Timeline of Ideas, Articles & Interviews 1982–2010 
2009: Art Directors Club New York for the magazine design of Mark Magazine (Frame Publishers)

Projects 
Notable projects that Van Gelder's design studio has worked on in recent years include:
2021: campaign Amsterdam Art Week 
2017: visual identity Anne De Grijff 
2016: rebranding of Illinois Institute of Technology School of Architecture, Chicago 
2016: visual identity De School - former club and entertainment complex in Amsterdam 
2009–2012: Mark Magazine (Frame Publishers), a platform for the practice and perception of architecture at the dawn of the third millennium. The magazine explores the boundaries of architecture and anticipates the industry's future. Mainstudio was responsible for the editorial design of the issues 17 (Dec/Jan 2009) to 36 (Feb/Mar 2012) and restyled the magazine twice.

Design juries 
Van Gelder has been part of the jury for the following design awards:
2021: Best Dutch Book Design 
2012: The One Show Design New York
2011: Tokyo Graphic Passport 
2011: Art Directors Club New York
2010: Selected Europe Barcelona 
2010: Art Directors Club The Netherlands

References

External links 
www.mainstudio.com

1978 births
Living people
Dutch graphic designers
People from Nijmegen
Utrecht School of the Arts alumni